Margaret (“Peggy”) A. Goodell (born March 23, 1965) is an American scientist working in the field of stem cell research. Goodell is Chair of the Department of Molecular and Cellular Biology at Baylor College of Medicine, Director of the Stem Cell and Regenerative Medicine (STaR) Center, and a member of the National Academy of Medicine. She is best known for her discovery of a novel method to isolate adult stem cells.

Goodell has been on the faculty of Baylor College of Medicine since 1997 as a member of the Center for Cell and Gene Therapy, and the Departments of Pediatrics, Molecular and Human Genetic, and Immunology. She holds the Vivian L. Smith Chair in Regenerative Medicine, and has received numerous awards for excellence in teaching and research.

Goodell is Chair of the Scientific Advisory Board of the Keystone Symposia, a former President of the International Society for Experimental Hematology, and has served on the board of the International Society for Stem Cell Research. She has also served as the chair of the Stem Cells and Regenerative Medicine committee for the American Society of Hematology. She is an Associate Editor for Blood and serves on the editorial boards of Cell Stem Cell and PLOS Biology.

Education 
Goodell received her B.Sc. at Imperial College of Science and Technology in London, England in 1986 with Honors.  She went on to earn her Ph.D. at University of Cambridge in 1991. She completed postdoctoral fellowships in Richard Mulligan’s lab at the prestigious Whitehead Institute for Biomedical Research at Massachusetts Institute of Technology and Harvard Medical School.

At MIT, she developed a novel method for isolating blood-forming stem cells from mouse bone marrow based on a fortuitous observation that stem cells efflux fluorescent lipophilic dyes.  This “side population (SP)” method has become widely used to isolate stem cells from a variety of species and adult tissues, including from cancer stem cells.

Research 
In 1997, Goodell joined the faculty of the Department of Pediatrics, Molecular and Human Genetics, and Immunology at Baylor College of Medicine in Houston, TX. She is a member of the Center for Cell and Gene Therapy and a founding member and director of the Stem Cell and Regenerative Medicine (STaR) Center.

Her current research is focused on the mechanisms that regulate hematopoietic stem cells (HSC), and how those regulatory mechanisms go awry in hematologic malignancies. The Goodell Laboratory, which has about 15 students and post-doctoral fellows, studies the effects of stresses, including infection, toxicity, and age, on the behavior of HSCs. The lab also looks at stem cell growth control, as well as the regulation of self-renewal and activation.

She has recently uncovered how the de novo DNA methyltransferase, DNMT3A — one of the most important tumor suppressors in the blood — contributes to stem cell self-renewal and differentiation in aging, inflammation, and cancer. These interests led her to develop new tools to examine the epigenetic regulation in stem cells, including whole-genome methylation profiling, ChIP sequencing, RNA-seq, as well as a suite of novel CRISPR-mediated techniques to investigate the relationship between DNA methylation and gene expression.

More than 150 of her peer-reviewed primary research papers have been published in journals including Nature and Blood.

Awards and honors 
She received the DeBakey Award for Excellence in Research in 2004 and 2010, the Stohlman Scholar Award from the Leukemia and Lymphoma Society in 2006, the American Heart Association’s Established Investigator Award from the year 2006 to 2011, the Edith and Peter O’Donnell Award in Medicine in 2011, and the Damashek Prize from the American Society of Hematology in 2012, as well as numerous recognitions for her teaching and mentorship. She had mentored more than doctoral students and post-doctoral fellows, many of whom have gone on to careers in academia.

Biography 
Goodell grew up in Bryan, Ohio with sisters Marian (a founding member and CEO of the Burning Man Project), Martha (a management consultant), and Melly (a physician). She is the daughter of Joe Goodell, former CEO of American Brass Company, and niece of Grace Goodell, professor of International Development at The Johns Hopkins School of Advanced International Studies. She lives in Houston, Texas with her husband and three daughters.

References 

Living people
American women biologists
Cell biologists
Baylor College of Medicine faculty
1965 births
People from Bryan, Ohio
Members of the National Academy of Medicine
American women academics
21st-century American women